eCost.com was an online retailer based in Torrance, California. Founded in 1999, the retailer sold a variety of products, such as electronics, jewelry, and household items.

The retailer was started as a subsidiary of PC Mall, Inc. in 1999. On April 11, 2005, eCost.com was spun off from PC Mall, Inc. In 2006, eCost.com was subsidized by PFSweb for US$29 million. PC Mall reacquired eCost.com for $2.3 million in February 2011. The agreement included the acquisition of roughly $1 million of eCOST's inventory. PC Mall established OnSale Inc., a new subsidiary that involved eCost in its enterprise.

On July 2, 2014, the website was shut down.

References

External links
 Official website

Companies based in Los Angeles County, California
American companies established in 1999
Retail companies established in 1999
Retail companies disestablished in 2014
Internet properties established in 1999
Internet properties disestablished in 2014
Online retailers of the United States
Defunct online companies of the United States
Companies based in Torrance, California
1999 establishments in California